The Sofia trolleybus system forms part of the public transport network  of Sofia, the capital city of Bulgaria. 

In operation since 8 February 1941, the system presently comprises ten routes with 257 km network build, of which 193 km are currently in use.

As of 2020 the average speed of the trolleybus system in Sofia is 15.7 km/h.

History
Trolleybus transport was the last form of surface public transport to develop in Sofia, after buses and trams. The first Sofia trolleybus line opened on 8 February 1941. The line was covered by 2 MAN trolleybuses, which were stored on the last stops during the night, due to the lack of depot.
 
In the 1950s and 1960s, massive development of the trolleybus transport in Sofia began. At that time, the construction of new trolleybus routes proceeded especially rapidly, and two depots ("Stochna Gara" and "Nadezhda") were opened, with a total capacity of 160 trolleybuses. In 1951, the first Bulgarian made trolleybuses entered service.
 
In 1987, a new depot, "Iskar", was opened with a capacity of 130 trolleybuses. Levski depot was opened in 1994 with capacity of 60 trolleybuses. As of 2021 three depots are in operation: Nadezhda, Iskar and Levski. The latter also serves as a storage and overhaul facility.

Lines
As of November 2021, the following trolleybus lines in Sofia are in service:

Trolleybus fleet

Current fleet
As of December 2022, the Sofia trolleybus fleet consisted of 141 trolleybuses, of which around 120 are serviceable.
 
The following models are currently part of the fleet:

The heritage fleet consists of the following vehicles:

Past fleet

Depots
 Nadezhda - opened in 1962, located on podpolkovnik Kalitin street, operates lines 5, 6, 7 and 9; houses trolleybuses with fleet numbers starting with 2
 Iskar - opened in 1987, located on Amsterdam street, operates lines 2, 3, 4, 5, 8 and 11; houses trolleybuses with fleet numbers starting with 1
 Levski - opened in 1994, located on Bessarabia street, serves as maintenance and overhaul facility and for storage and dismantling of decommissioned vehicles. Since November 2021 also operates line 1.

See also

Sofia Metro
Sofia Public Transport
Sofia Tramway
List of trolleybus systems

References

External links

 Official website of Sofia Public Electrical Transport Company JSC (in English)
 Images of the Sofia trolleybus system, at railfaneurope.net
 
 

Transport in Sofia
Sofia
Sofia